Slavery in Portugal occurred since before the country's formation. During the pre-independence period, inhabitants of the current Portuguese territory were often enslaved and enslaved others. After independence, during the existence of the Kingdom of Portugal, the country played a leading role in the Atlantic slave trade, which involved the mass trade and transportation of slaves from Africa and other parts of the world to the American continent. The import of slaves was banned in european Portugal in 1761 by the Marquês de Pombal. However, slavery within the African Portuguese colonies was only abolished in 1869.

The Atlantic slave trade began in 1444, when Portuguese traders brought the first large number of slaves from Africa to Europe. In 1526, Portuguese mariners carried the first shipload of African slaves to Brazil in the Americas, establishing the Atlantic slave trade.

History

Ancient era 

Slavery was a major economic and social institution in Europe during the classical era and a great deal is known about the ancient Greeks and Romans in relation to the topic. Rome added Portugal to its empire (2nd century BC), the latter a province of Lusitania at the time, and the name of the future kingdom was derived from "Portucale", a Roman and post-Roman settlement situated at the mouth of the Douro River. The details of slavery in ancient Rome slavery in Roman Portugal are not well-known; however, there were several forms of slavery, including enslaved miners and domestic servants.

Visigothic and Suebi kingdoms 
The Visigoths and the Suebi (Germanic tribes), of the 5th century AD, seized control of the Iberian peninsula as the Roman Empire fell. At the time, Portugal did not exist as a separate kingdom, but was primarily a part of the Visigothic Iberian kingdom (the Visigothic ruling class lived apart and heavily taxed the native population). However, during this period, a gradual transition to feudalism and serfdom was occurring throughout Europe.

Islamic Iberia 

After the Umayyad conquest of Hispania in the 8th century, in which Moors from North Africa crossed the Strait of Gibraltar and defeated the Visigothic rulers of Iberia, the territory of both modern-day Portugal and Spain fell under Islamic control. The pattern of slavery and serfdom in the Iberian Peninsula differs from the rest of Western Europe due to the Islamic conquest. They established Moorish kingdoms in Iberia, including the area that is occupied by modern Portugal. In comparison to the north, classical-style slavery continued for a longer period of time in southern Europe, and trade between Christian Europe, across the Mediterranean, with Islamic North Africa meant that Slavic and Christian Iberian enslaved people appeared in Italy, Spain, Southern France, and Portugal; in the 8th century, the Islamic conquest in Portugal and Spain changed this pattern.

Trade ties between the Moorish kingdoms and the North African Moorish state led to a greater flow of trade within those geographical areas. In addition, the Moors engaged sections of Spaniards and Portuguese Christians in slave labor. There was not a "racial" component to slavery in Iberia. The Moors used ethnic European slaves: 1/12 of Iberian population were slave Europeans, less than 1% of Iberia were Moors and more than 99% were native Iberians. Periodic Arab and Moorish raiding expeditions were sent from Islamic Iberia to ravage the remaining Christian Iberian kingdoms, bringing back stolen goods and slaves. In a raid against Lisbon in 1189, for example, the Almohad caliph Yaqub al-Mansur held 3,000 women and children as captives, while his governor of Córdoba, in a subsequent attack upon Silves, held 3,000 Christian slaves in 1191. In addition, the Christian Iberians who lived within Arab and Moorish-ruled territories were subject to specific laws and taxes for state protection.

Reconquista 

Muslim Moors who converted to Christianity, known as Moriscos, were enslaved by the Portuguese during the Reconquista; 9.3 per cent of slaves in southern Portugal were Moors and many Moors were enslaved in 16th-century Portugal.
It has been documented that other slaves were treated better than Moriscos, the slaves were less than 1% of population.

After the Reconquista period, Moorish slaves began to outnumber Slavic slaves in both importance and numbers in Portugal.

Age of Discovery

Black slaves 
African slaves prior to 1441 were predominately Berbers and Arabs from the North African Barbary coast, known as "Moors" to the Iberians. They were typically enslaved during wars and conquests between Christian and Islamic kingdoms. The first expeditions of Sub-Saharan Africa were sent out by Prince Infante D. Henrique, known commonly today as Henry the Navigator, with the intent to probe how far the kingdoms of the Moors and their power reached. The expeditions sent by Henry came back with African slaves as a way to compensate for the expenses of their voyages. The enslavement of Africans was seen as a military campaign because the people that the Portuguese encountered were identified as Moorish and thus associated with Islam. The royal chronicler Gomes Eanes de Zurara was never decided on the "Moorishness" of the slaves brought back from Africa, due to a seeming lack of contact with Islam. Slavery in Portugal and the number of slaves expanded after the Portuguese began an exploration of Sub-Saharan Africa.

Slave raids in sub-Saharan Africa began in the 1430s and 1440s as war campaigns, but this period was short-lived. The Portuguese quickly transitioned into a trade network with African nobility and slavers. Prince Infante D. Henrique began selling African slaves in Lagos in 1444. In 1455, Pope Nicholas V gave Portugal the rights to continue the slave trade in West Africa, under the provision that they convert all people who are enslaved. The Portuguese soon expanded their trade along the whole west coast of Africa. Infante D Henrique held the monopoly on all expeditions to Africa granted by the crown until his death in 1460. Afterward, any ship sailing for Africa required authorization from the crown. All slaves and goods brought back to Portugal were subject to duties and tariffs. Slaves were baptized before shipment. Their process of enslavement, which was viewed by critics as cruel, was justified by the conversion of the enslaved to Christianity.

The high demand for slaves was due to a shortage of laborers in Portugal. Black slaves were in higher demand than Moorish slaves because they were much easier to convert to Christianity and less likely to escape. Although it was more expensive to purchase a slave than it was to employ a freeman, the sparse population and the lack of free labor made the purchase of a slave a necessary investment. The number of black slaves in Portugal given by contemporary accounts argue that Lisbon and the colonies of Portugal averaged a maximum of 10% of the population between the 16th and 18th centuries, but these numbers are impossible to verify. Most slaves in Portugal were concentrated in Lisbon and to the south in the Algarve. The number of black slaves brought to Lisbon and sold cannot be known. This is because the records of both royal institutions responsible for the sale of black enlsaved people, the Casa de Guiné and the Casa dos Escravos were damaged during the earthquake of 1755 in Lisbon, and the fiscal records containing the numbers and sales of these companies were destroyed. The records of the royal chronicler Zurara claim that 927 African slaves were brought to Portugal between 1441 and 1448, and an estimated 1000 black slaves arrived in Portugal each year afterward. A common estimate is that around 2,000 black slaves arrive in Lisbon annually after 1490.

During the 15th century, there were thousands of Africans in Portugal but were rare in Europe. The majority of Africans were servants but some were considered as trustworthy and responsible slaves. Because of Portugal's small population, Portuguese colonization was only possible with a large number of slaves they had acquired. In the late 15th and into the 16th centuries, the Portuguese economic reliance on slaves was less in question than the sheer number of slaves found in Portugal. People wishing to purchase slaves in Portugal had two sources, the royal slaving company, the Casa da Guiné, or from slave merchants who had purchased their slaves through the Casa de Guiné to sell as retail. There were up to 70 slave merchants in Lisbon in the 1550s. Slave auctions occurred in the town or market square, or in the streets of central Lisbon. The sale of slaves was compared by observers as similar to the sale of horses or livestock. The laws of commerce regarding slavery address them as merchandise or objects. There was a period of time set upon purchase for the buyer to decide if he is happy with the slave he had purchased.

The occupations of slaves varied widely. Some slaves in Lisbon could find themselves working in domestic settings, but most worked hard labor in the mines and metal forges, while others worked at the docks loading and maintaining ships. Some slaves worked peddling cheap goods at the markets and returning the profits to their masters. Opportunities for slaves to become free were scarce, however, there were many instances in which slaves had either elevated their status or obtained their freedom. Slaves were able to buy their freedom by saving any earnings, so long as their masters allow them to keep their earnings, or purchase a slave to replace them. Women slaves could be freed if their masters chose to marry them, but this was more common among the colonies. When Lisbon was on the verge of being invaded in 1580, slaves were promised their freedom in exchange for their military service. 440 slaves took the offer and most, after being freed, left Portugal. Black female slaves were desired for sexual purposes, resulting in many mixed-race offspring. This prompted the Council of Trent in 1563 to denounce the widespread immorality. Mulattoes had the ability to integrate into society, some would even command whole fleets of ships. Slavery did little to alter society in Portugal, due to the slight ease of enslaved people’s integration, those who did not assimilate were treated similarly to the poor.

Asians 

After the Portuguese first made contact with Japan in 1543, a large-scale slave trade developed in the Nanban trade, one of the Portuguese trade includes the Portuguese purchase of Japanese that sold them to various locations overseas, including Portugal itself, the Nanban trade existed throughout the 16th and 17th centuries. Many documents mention the large slave trade along with protests against the enslavement of Japanese. Japanese slaves are believed to be the first of their nation to end up in Europe, and the Portuguese purchased large numbers of Japanese slave girls to bring to Portugal for sexual purposes, as noted by the Church in 1555. King Sebastian feared that it was having a negative effect on Catholic proselytization since the slave trade in Japanese was growing to large proportions, so he commanded that it be banned in 1571. Records of three Japanese slaves dating from the 16th century, named Gaspar Fernandes, Miguel and Ventura who ended up in Mexico showed that they were purchased by Portuguese slave traders in Japan, brought to Manila from where they were shipped to Mexico by their owner Perez.

More than several hundred Japanese, especially women, were sold as slaves.
Portuguese visitors so often engaged in slavery in Japan and occasionally South Asian and African crew members were taken to Macau and other Portuguese colonies in Southeast Asia, the Americas, and India, where there was a community of Japanese slaves and traders in Goa by the early 17th century, many of whom became prostitutes.
Enslaved Japanese women were even occasionally sold as concubines to black African crew members, along with their European counterparts serving on Portuguese ships trading in Japan, mentioned by Luis Cerqueira, a Portuguese Jesuit, in a 1598 document. Hideyoshi blamed the Portuguese and Jesuits for this slave trade and banned Christian proselytizing as a result. Historians have noted, however, that anti-Portuguese propaganda was actively promoted by the Japanese, particularly with regards to the Portuguese purchases of Japanese women for sexual purposes.

Some Korean slaves were bought by the Portuguese and brought to Portugal from Japan, where they had been among the tens of thousands of Korean prisoners of war transported to Japan during the Japanese invasions of Korea. Historians pointed out that at the same time Hideyoshi expressed his indignation and outrage at the Portuguese trade in Japanese slaves, he himself was engaging in a mass slave trade of Korean prisoners of war in Japan. Chinese were bought in large numbers as slaves by the Portuguese in the 1520s. Japanese Christian daimyos mainly responsible for selling to the Portuguese their fellow Japanese. Japanese women and Japanese men, Javanese, Chinese, and Indians were all sold as slaves in Portugal.

Some Chinese slaves in Spain ended up there after being brought to Lisbon, Portugal, and sold when they were boys. Tristán de la China was a Chinese who was taken as a slave by the Portuguese, while he was still a boy and in the 1520s was obtained by Cristobál de Haro in Lisbon, and taken to live in Seville and Valladolid. He was paid for his service as a translator in the 1525 Loaísa expedition, during which he was still an adolescent. The survivors, including Tristan, were shipwrecked for a decade until 1537 when they were brought back by a Portuguese ship to Lisbon.

There are records of Chinese slaves in Lisbon as early as 1540. According to modern historians, the first known visit of a Chinese person to Europe dates to 1540 (or soon after), when a Chinese scholar, apparently enslaved by Portuguese raiders somewhere on the southern China coast, was brought to Portugal. Purchased by João de Barros, he worked with the Portuguese historian on translating Chinese texts into Portuguese.

In 16th-century southern Portugal there were Chinese slaves but the number of them was described as "negligible", being outnumbered by East Indian, Mourisco, and African slaves. Amerindians, Chinese, Malays, and Indians were slaves in Portugal but in far fewer number than Turks, Berbers, and Arabs. China and Malacca were origins of slaves delivered to Portugal by Portuguese viceroys. A testament from 23 October 1562 recorded a Chinese man named António who was enslaved and owned by a Portuguese woman, Dona Maria de Vilhena, a wealthy noblewoman in Évora. António was among the three most common male names given to male slaves in Évora. D. Maria owned one of the only two Chinese slaves in Évora and she specifically selected and used him from among the slaves she owned to drive her mules for her because he was Chinese since rigorous and demanding tasks were assigned to Mourisco, Chinese, and Indian slaves. D. Maria's owning a Chinese, three Indians, and three Mouriscos among her fifteen slaves reflected on her high social status, since Chinese, Mouriscos, and Indians were among the ethnicities of prized slaves and were very expensive compared to blacks, so high class individuals owned these ethnicities and it was because her former husband Simão was involved in the slave trade in the east that she owned slaves of many different ethnicities. When she died, D. Maria freed twelve of her slaves including this Chinese man in her testament, leaving them with sums from 20,000 to 10,000 réis in money. D. Maria de Vilhena was the daughter of the nobleman and explorer Sancho de Tovar, the capitão of Sofala (List of colonial governors of Mozambique), and she was married twice, the first marriage to the explorer Cristóvão de Mendonça, and her second marriage was to Simão da Silveira, capitão of Diu (Lista de governadores, capitães e castelões de Diu). D. Maria was left a widow by Simão, and she was a major slave owner, possessing the most slaves in Évora, with her testament recording fifteen slaves.

A legal case was brought before the Spanish Council of the Indies in the 1570s, involving two Chinese men in Seville, one of them a freeman, Esteban Cabrera, and the other a slave, Diego Indio, against Juan de Morales, Diego's owner. Diego called on Esteban to give evidence as a witness on his behalf. Diego recalled that he was taken as a slave by Francisco de Casteñeda from Mexico, to Nicaragua, then to Lima in Peru, then to Panama, and eventually to Spain via Lisbon, while he was still a boy.

Chinese boys were kidnapped from Macau and sold as slaves in Lisbon while they were still children. Brazil imported some of Lisbon's Chinese slaves. Fillippo Sassetti saw some Chinese and Japanese slaves in Lisbon among the large slave community in 1578, although most of the slaves were blacks. Brazil and Portugal were both recipients of Chinese slaves bought by Portuguese. Portugal exported to Brazil some Chinese slaves. Military, religious, and civil service secretarial work and other lenient and light jobs were given to Chinese slaves while hard labor was given to Africans. Only African slaves in 1578 Lisbon outnumbered the large numbers of Japanese and Chinese slaves in the same city. Some of the Chinese slaves were sold in Brazil, a Portuguese colony. Cooking was the main profession of Chinese slaves around 1580 in Lisbon, according to Fillippo Sassetti from Florence and the Portuguese viewed them as diligent, smart, and "loyal".

The Portuguese also valued Oriental slaves more than the black Africans and the Moors for their rarity. Chinese slaves were more expensive than Moors and blacks and showed off the high status of the owner The Portuguese attributed qualities like intelligence and industriousness to Chinese slaves. Traits such as high intelligence were ascribed to Chinese, Indian, and Japanese slaves.

In 1595, a law was passed by Portugal banning the selling and buying of Chinese and Japanese slaves due to hostility from the Chinese and Japanese regarding the trafficking in Japanese and Chinese slaves On 19 February 1624, the King of Portugal forbade the enslavement of Chinese people of either sex.

A Portuguese woman, Dona Ana de Ataíde owned an Indian man named António as a slave in Évora. He served as a cook for her. Ana de Ataíde's Indian slave escaped from her in 1587. A large number of slaves were forcibly brought there since the commercial, artisanal, and service sectors all flourished in a regional capital like Évora.

A fugitive Indian slave from Evora named António went to Badajoz after leaving his master in 1545.

Portuguese domination was accepted by the "docile" Jau slaves. In Évora, Brites Figueira owned a Javanese (Jau) slave named Maria Jau. Antão Azedo took an Indian slave named Heitor to Evora, who along with another slave was from Bengal were among the 34 Indian slaves in total who were owned by Tristão Homem, a nobleman in 1544 in Évora. Manuel Gomes previously owned a slave who escaped in 1558 at age 18 and he was said to be from the "land of Prester John of the Indias" named Diogo.

In Évora, men were owned and used as slaves by female establishments like convents for nuns. Three male slaves and three female slaves were given to the nuns of Montemor by the alcaide-mor's widow. In order to "serve those who serve God" and being told to obey orders "in all things that they ordered them", a boy named Manual along with his slave mother were given to the Nuns of Montemor by father Jorge Fernandes in 1544. A capelão do rei, father João Pinto left an Indian man in Porto, where he was picked up in 1546 by the Évora-based Santa Marta convent's nuns to serve as their slave. However, female slaves did not serve in male establishments, unlike vice versa.

Slavery in Macau and the coast of China 

Beginning in the 16th century, the Portuguese tried to establish trading ports and settlements along the coast of China. Early attempts at establishing such bases, such as those in Ningbo and Quanzhou, were however destroyed by the Chinese, following violent raids by the settlers to neighboring ports, which included pillaging and plunder and sometimes enslavement.
The resulting complaints made it to the province's governor who commanded the settlement destroyed and the inhabitants wiped out. In 1545, a force of 60,000 Chinese troops descended on the community, and 800 of the 1,200 Portuguese residents were massacred, with 25 vessels and 42 junks destroyed.

Until the mid-17th century, during the early Portuguese mandate of Macau, some 5,000 slaves lived in the territory, in addition to 2,000 Portuguese and an ever-growing number of Chinese, which in 1664 reached 20,000.
This number decreased in the following decades to between 1000 and 2000. Most of the slaves were of African origin. Rarely did Chinese women marry Portuguese, initially, mostly Goans, Ceylonese/Sinhalese (from today's Sri Lanka), Indochinese, Malay (from Malacca), and Japanese women were the wives of the Portuguese men in Macau. Slave women of Indian, Indonesian, Malay, and Japanese origin were used as partners by Portuguese men. Japanese girls would be purchased in Japan by Portuguese men.  From 1555 onwards Macau received slave women of Timorese origin as well as women of African origin, and from Malacca and India. Macau was permitted by Pombal to receive an influx of Timorese women. Macau received an influx of African slaves, Japanese slaves as well as Christian Korean slaves who were bought by the Portuguese from the Japanese after they were taken prisoner during the Japanese invasions of Korea in the era of Hideyoshi.

On 24 June 1622, the Dutch attacked Macau in the Battle of Macau, expecting to turn the area into a Dutch possession, with an 800-strong invasion force led by under Captain Kornelis Reyerszoon. The relatively small number of defenders repulsed the Dutch attack, which was not repeated. The majority of the defenders were Africans slaves, with only a few dozen Portuguese soldiers and priests in support, and they accounted for most of the victims in the battle. Following the defeat, the Dutch Governor Jan Coen said of the Macao slaves, that "it was they who defeated and drove away our people there". In China during the 19th century, the British consul to China noted that some Portuguese merchants were still buying children between five and eight years of age.

In 1814, the Jiaqing Emperor added a clause to the section of the fundamental laws of China titled "Wizards, Witches, and all Superstitions, prohibited", later modified in 1821 and published in 1826 by the Daoguang Emperor, which sentenced Europeans, namely Portuguese Christians who would not repent their conversion, to be sent to Muslim cities in Xinjiang as slaves to Muslim leaders.

Treatment 

During transport to Portugal, enslaved people were fastened and chained with manacles, padlocks, and rings around their necks. Portuguese owners could whip, chain, and pour burning hot wax and fat onto the skin of their slaves, and punish their slaves in any way that they wished, as long as the slaves remained alive. The Portuguese also used branding irons to brand their slaves as property.

Banning 
Voices condemning the slave trade were raised early during the Atlantic Slave Trade period. Among them was Gaspar da Cruz, a Dominican friar who dismissed any arguments by the slave traffickers that they had "legally" purchased already-enslaved children, among the earliest condemnations of slavery in Europe during this period.

From an early age during the Atlantic Slave Trade period, the crown attempted to stop the trading of non-African slaves. The enslavement and overseas trading of Chinese slaves, who the Portuguese prized, was specifically addressed in response to Chinese authorities' requests, who, although not against the enslavement of people in Macau and Chinese territories, which was common practice, at different times attempted to stop the transport of slaves outside the territory. In 1595, a Portuguese royal decree banned the selling and buying of ethnically Chinese slaves; it was reiterated by the Portuguese king on 19 February 1624, and, in 1744, by the Qianlong Emperor, who forbade the practice to Chinese subjects, reiterating his order in 1750. However, these laws were not able to stop the trade completely, a practice which lasted until the 1700s. In the American colonies, Portugal halted the use of Chinese, Japanese, Europeans, and Indians to work as slaves for sugar plantations, which was reserved exclusively for African slaves.

The ban on importing slaves from Africa occurred in continental Portugal and Portuguese India through a 1761 decree by the Marquis of Pombal, not for humanitarian reasons, but mainly because they were needed in Brasil. The Atlantic slave trade was definitively outlawed altogether by Portugal in 1836, at the same time as other European powers, as a result of British diplomatic pressure. Slavery within the Portuguese colonies in Africa would only be definitively abolished in 1869, following a treaty between the United States and Britain for the joint suppression of the slave trade.

See also 
 Al-Andalus
 Atlantic slave trade
 Barbary pirates
 Economic history of Portugal
 Slavery in ancient Rome
 Slavery in Angola
 Slavery in Brazil
 Slavery in China
 Slavery in India

References

Bibliography 
 

 
Economic history of Portugal
Human rights abuses in Portugal